Rushine De Reuck (born 1 January 1996) is a South African soccer player who plays as a defender or defensive midfielder for South African Premier Division side Mamelodi Sundowns and the South Africa national team.

Club career
De Reuck played for the ASD Academy in Cape Town as a young player and had a trial with Porto in 2014. Following a two-week trial at Paços de Ferreira he signed for the club in September 2014 on a contract until January 2015. De Reuck returned to South Africa shortly afterwards, originally temporarily, but following a change of coach at Paços de Ferreira, he decided to remain in South Africa. De Reuck later revealed he learnt a lot from then Paços de Ferreira manager Paulo Fonseca. Following his return to South Africa, De Reuck had trials with Ajax Cape Town, Cape Town All Stars, Milano United and Mbombela United, but was rejected by all of the them, before playing for Hellenic for a season.

In the summer of 2017, De Reuck signed for South African Premier Division side Maritzburg United on a two-year contract. His debut for Maritzburg United came on 20 August 2017 in a 2–0 victory away to Platinum Stars, and he went on to appear 11 times in the league for Maritzburg over the course of the 2017–18 season. The 2018–19 season saw him play more regularly for the club, making 25 league appearances for the club over the course of the season.

De Reuck started the 2019–20 season strongly and was linked with a call-up to the South Africa national football team. In December 2019, Maritzburg United manager Eric Tinkler said that De Reuck had 'a lot of qualities', but that 'there's still a lot for him to improve on', citing his decision-making as an area in which he could improve In June 2020, De Reuck revealed he was "surprised", given his form, not to be called up to the South Africa national football squad.

He signed for Mamelodi Sundowns on a five-year deal on 30 January 2021.

International career
De Reuck made his debut for South Africa on 10 June 2021 in a 3–2 friendly win over Uganda. He made 6 appearances as South Africa won the 2021 COSAFA Cup.

Style of play
He can play as a centre-back, as a right-back or as a defensive midfielder.

Personal life
De Reuck was born in Cape Town and grew up in the neighbourhood of Kalksteenfontein. He is a fan of South African club Kaizer Chiefs.

Career statistics

References

Living people
1996 births
Soccer players from Cape Town
South African soccer players
South Africa international soccer players
Association football central defenders
Association football fullbacks
Association football midfielders
Hellenic F.C. players
Maritzburg United F.C. players
Mamelodi Sundowns F.C. players
South African Premier Division players
South African expatriate soccer players
Expatriate footballers in Portugal
South African expatriate sportspeople in Portugal